Barbara Good may refer to:

 Barbara Good (The Good Life), a character from the TV sitcom The Good Life
 Barbara J. Good (born c. 1920), Irish badminton player